Gemmula contrasta is a species of sea snail, a marine gastropod mollusk in the family Turridae.

Description
The length of the shell attains 17.8 mm.

Distribution
This marine species occurs off Mactan Island, the Philippines.

Original description
 Stahlschmidt P., Poppe G.T. & Tagaro S.P. (2018). Descriptions of remarkable new turrid species from the Philippines. Visaya. 5(1): 5-64. page(s): 33, pl. 25 figs 4-5.

References

External links
 Worms Link

contrasta
Gastropods described in 2018